Bob Murawski (born June 14, 1964) is an American film editor. He was awarded the 2010 Academy Award for Best Film Editing for his work on The Hurt Locker, which he shared with his wife, fellow editor Chris Innis. He often works with film director Sam Raimi, having edited the Spider-Man trilogy, Oz the Great and Powerful, and Doctor Strange in the Multiverse of Madness. Murawski is an elected member of the American Cinema Editors, and is (with Sage Stallone) the co-founder of Grindhouse Releasing, an acclaimed film distribution company specializing in re-releases of cult films.

Early life and career
Murawski was born in Bad Axe, Michigan, and grew up in the thumb of the state. He was the valedictorian at his high school in Bad Axe, Michigan, and graduated from Michigan State University with a major in Telecommunications. Soon after graduation, he interned with Detroit-based film sub-distributor, Bob Mason of Mason Releasing. Murawski then moved to Hollywood, where he worked as an assistant editor on several films, including Raimi's comic-book-inspired picture Darkman.

Film editing
Murawski has largely worked as a film editor, primarily for director/producer Sam Raimi, on films including Army of Darkness, The Gift, Drag Me to Hell and the Spider-Man series of films. He also co-edited the Academy Award winning film, The Hurt Locker with editor Chris Innis. Raimi has said of working with Murawski

He’d come (down to the set) to see how things were going and to let me know if he’d just cut something that wasn’t working the way he’d wanted it to, or to suggest a pick-up shot I should get for a piece he felt we needed in a sequence I hadn’t realized I needed. He’s very detail-oriented... So we’re very close collaborators.

Raimi finds editing with Murawski to be "relaxing", adding

I love it... I can watch the film come together, so it’s a time of discovery for me as Bob and I fit all the pieces together.

Murawski has also cut music videos for such groups as The Ramones, Motörhead, and Sublime. Bob Murawski appears in the documentary 78/52 directed by Alexandre O. Philippe, a post-modern breakdown of the iconic shower scene in Alfred Hitchcock's Psycho. He is represented by International Creative Management (ICM).

Film distribution
In 1995, born out of a mutual love for rare and unseen cult films, Bob Murawski and actor/director and son of Sylvester Stallone, Sage Stallone formed Grindhouse Releasing. Murawski continues to run Grindhouse and partner Box Office Spectaculars, both companies that restore, preserve, and distribute classic cult and Euro-horror films.  The two labels have digitally remastered classic cult films such as The Swimmer starring Burt Lancaster, The Big Gundown starring Lee Van Cleef and Tomas Milian, Lucio Fulci's spaghetti-horror masterpiece, E tu vivrai nel terrore (a.k.a. The Beyond) as well as Italian cannibal films Make Them Die Slowly (a.k.a. Cannibal Ferox),  Cannibal Holocaust, American cult film I Drink Your Blood (1970) (directed by David E. Durston), 
and director Juan Piquer Simón's cult horror film, Pieces. The company is currently presenting the release of An American Hippie in Israel (on Blu-ray/DVD) and Duke Mitchell's previously unreleased independent feature, Gone with the Pope (screening theatrically). Box Office Spectaculars and Grindhouse has also handled the theatrical re-release and negative restoration of director Sam Raimi's cult 
horror film, The Evil Dead as well as helming the digital restorations (in association with Columbia Pictures/Sony) of the rare spaghetti western The Big Gundown and The Swimmer directed by Frank Perry.

Personal life
Murawski is married to film editor Christina "Chris" Innis. The two editors met while working together on the Universal/CBS television series American Gothic and married in 2008. The pair has worked together on the Academy Award winning film The Hurt Locker, and on several Sam Raimi productions such as The Gift, and Spider-Man, as well as collaborating on Grindhouse Releasing/Box Office Spectaculars releases.

Selected filmography

Film editing
Darkman (1990) (assistant editor, director Sam Raimi)
Army of Darkness (1992) (director Sam Raimi)
Hard Target (1993) (director John Woo)
American Gothic (1995–1996) TV series (Editor: Title sequence & Recaps)
From Dusk Till Dawn 2: Texas Blood Money (1999) (director Scott Spiegel)
The Gift (2000) (edited with Arthur Coburn, director Sam Raimi)
Spider-Man (2002) (edited with Arthur Coburn, director Sam Raimi)
Spider-Man 2 (2004) (director Sam Raimi)
Spider-Man 3 (2007) (director Sam Raimi)
The Hurt Locker (2008) (edited with Chris Innis, director Kathryn Bigelow)
Drag Me to Hell (2009) (director Sam Raimi)
The Resident (2010) (editor/re-cut, director Antti Jokinen)
Priest (2011) (editor/re-cut)
Oz the Great and Powerful (2013) (director Sam Raimi)
Dracula Untold (2014) (editor/re-cut) (director Gary Shore)
Poltergeist (2015) (editor/re-cut) (director Gil Keenan)
Ash vs Evil Dead (2015, TV pilot) (editor) (director Sam Raimi)
Kong: Skull Island (2017) (Additional Editing) (director Jordan Vogt-Roberts)
The Other Side of the Wind (2018) (director Orson Welles)
Hopper / Welles (2020)  (director Orson Welles) 
Doctor Strange in the Multiverse of Madness (2022) (director Sam Raimi)

Film distributor
Cannibal Ferox (a.k.a. Make them Die Slowly) - (Grindhouse Releasing) - released LD: 1997; VHS: 1999: DVD: July 2000, Blu-ray: 2015
Cat in the Brain (a.k.a. Nightmare Concert, Un gatto nel cervello) - (Box Office Spectaculars) - released LD: 1998, DVD: 2009
The Beyond (a.k.a. Seven Doors of Death, E tu vivrai nel terrore! L'aldilà) - (Grindhouse Releasing) - released DVD: October 2000, re-released 2008, Blu-ray: 2015
I Drink Your Blood (a.k.a. Hydro-Phobia) - (Box Office Spectaculars) - released DVD: 2002; re-released 2006
Cannibal Holocaust - (Grindhouse Releasing) - released DVD: 2005, re-released 2008, Blu-ray: 2014
Pieces (a.k.a. Mil gritos tiene la noche) - (Box Office Spectaculars) - released DVD: October 2008
Gone with the Pope (a.k.a. Kiss the Ring) - (Box Office Spectaculars / Grindhouse Releasing) - released 2010 (theatrical), 2015 (Blu-ray/DVD combo)
An American Hippie in Israel (a.k.a. Ha-Trempist, The Hitch Hiker) - (Box Office Spectaculars / Grindhouse Releasing) (Blu-ray/DVD release, 2013)
Corruption - (Box Office Spectaculars / Sony Pictures) (Restoration, Blu-ray/DVD release, 2013)
The Big Gundown (a.k.a. La resa dei conti) - (Box Office Spectaculars / Sony Pictures) (Restoration, Blu-ray/DVD release, 2013)
The Swimmer - (Box Office Spectaculars / Sony Pictures) (Restoration, Blu-ray/DVD release, 2014)
Massacre Mafia Style - (Box Office Spectaculars) Blu-ray/DVD release 2015

Awards and nominations
The Swimmer - (Won) - The 2014 International Press Academy's Satellite Award - Outstanding Overall Blu-ray/DVD (producer /Grindhouse Releasing)
The Hurt Locker - (Won) - 2010 Academy of Motion Picture Arts and Sciences ("Oscar")Best Film Editing(shared with co-editor Chris Innis)
The Hurt Locker - (Won) - 2010 BAFTA - Best Film Editing (shared with co-editor Chris Innis)
The Hurt Locker - (Won) - 2010 ACE Eddie Award - Best Feature Film Editing (Dramatic) (shared with co-editor Chris Innis)
The Hurt Locker - (Won) -  The International Press Academy's Golden Satellite Award -Best Film Editing - (shared with co-editor Chris Innis)
The Hurt Locker - (Won) - The Online Film Critics Association - Best Film Editing (shared with co-editor Chris Innis)
The Hurt Locker - (Won) -  Boston Society of Film Critics - Best Film Editing (shared with co-editor Chris Innis)
The Hurt Locker - (Won) - The Las Vegas Film Critics Association - Best Film Editing (shared with co-editor Chris Innis)
The Hurt Locker - (Won) - International Cinephile Society award - Best Editing (shared with co-editor Chris Innis)
The Hurt Locker - (Nominated) - The Broadcast Film Critics Association Critic's Choice Awards - Best Film Editing (shared with co-editor Chris Innis)
The Hurt Locker - (Nominated) -  Hollywood Post Alliance AwardsOutstanding Editing - Feature Film (shared with co-editor Chris Innis)
Spider-Man 2 (Nominated) - 2004 Golden Satellite Awards, Satellite Award for Best Editing
Spider-Man 2 - American Film Institute Awards 2004, official selection for AFI top ten movies of the year.
The Other Side of the Wind - National Board of Review ― William K. Everson Award for Film History (shared with producers) 
The Other Side of the Wind - National Society of Film Critics ― Film Heritage Award (shared with producers) 
The Other Side of the Wind - (Won) - National Association of Film Critics ― Best editing award (shared with Orson Welles) 
The Other Side of the Wind -  (Won) - San Francisco Film Critics Circle ― Best editing award (shared with Welles) 
The Other Side of the Wind - (Won) - Los Angeles Film Critics Association  ― Special citation (shared with producers) 
The Other Side of the Wind - (Runner-up) - Boston Society of Film Critics  ― Best editing award (with Welles) 
The Other Side of the Wind - (Runner-up) - International Cinephile Society  ― Best editing award (with Welles) 
The Other Side of the Wind - (Nominated) - Chicago Film Critics Association  ― Best editing award (with Welles) 
First recipient of the Campari Passion for Film Award (2018), 75th Venice International Film Festival.

See also
List of Academy Award winning couples

References

External links

"Tech Support Interview: The Crafts of The Hurt Locker," Incontention, by Guy Lodge, January 7, 2010
Below the Line Magazine - "Contenders - Editors Bob Murawski and Chris Innis, The Hurt Locker", by Mary Ann Skweres, March 2, 2010

1964 births
American Cinema Editors
Best Editing BAFTA Award winners
Best Film Editing Academy Award winners
Film distributors (people)
Film producers from Michigan
American documentary filmmakers
Living people
Michigan State University alumni
Artists from Detroit
American people of Polish descent
People from Bad Axe, Michigan
American film editors